The 44th Reconnaissance Squadron is a unit of the United States Air Force's 432nd Wing, Air Combat Command and stationed at Creech Air Force Base, Nevada, where it operates unmanned aerial vehicles. The squadron is assigned to the 432nd Operations Group, and has been reported to operate the Lockheed Martin RQ-170 Sentinel.

As the 430th Bombardment Squadron it saw combat with the 502d Bombardment Group in the closing months of World War II, flying from Northwest Field, Guam, earning a Distinguished Unit Citation.  It remained in the Pacific until it was inactivated on 15 April 1946.

History

World War I
The first predecessor of the squadron was established as the 44th Aero Squadron at Camp Kelly, Texas in June 1917, shortly after the United States' entry into World War I.  The squadron moved to Wilbur Wright Field, Ohio in August apparently serving as a flying training unit with Standard SJ-1, Curtiss JN-4, and possibly Dayton-Wright DH-4 aircraft.  When Air Service training units were reorganized as lettered field squadrons in 1918, the squadron became Squadron K (later Squadron P), Wilbur Wright Field, Ohio. The squadron was demobilized in April 1919.

Inter war years
The second predecessor of the squadron was organized in June 1922 as the 44th Squadron (Observation) at Post Field, Oklahoma, where it flew Dayton-Wright DH-4 and
evidently Douglas O-2 aircraft conducting training with the Field Artillery School.  The two squadrons were consolidated in 1924, with the consolidated unit retaining the name 44th Observation Squadron.  In June 1927, the squadron moved to March Field, California, where it was inactivated at the end of July.

Reactivated in the Panama Canal Zone in April 1931. It was the sole reconnaissance unit in the Canal Zone at the time, flying light reconnaissance aircraft over both approaches of the canal.  The 44th was the first Air Corps unit to occupy Albrook Field after it opened in 1932–33.

World War II

Caribbean defense
It was redesignated as the 44th Reconnaissance Squadron on 1 September 1937, had the suffix designation (Medium Range) added on 6 December 1939 and, on 20 November 1940 this was changed to (Heavy). The status of the unit changed from "assigned" to "attached" to the 16th Pursuit Group from 1 February 1940. Later, on 20 November 1940, the unit was attached to the 9th Bombardment Group.

The Squadron had been among the first Canal Zone-based units to re-equip with the Douglas B-18 Bolo, which joined the unit as early as December 1938, although several veteran Thomas-Morse O-19C biplanes were still rendering good service as well. In June 1941, the Squadron began to receive Boeing B-17B Flying Fortresses from units in the United States upgrading to the C or D models.  The Squadron moved from Albrook to Howard Field on 8 July, ending its nine-year stint at Albrook. There, with five B-18s, one B-18A and the B-17B, the Squadron commenced long range reconnaissance training in earnest.

The assignment to Howard Field was short lived and the squadron moved to Atkinson Field, British Guiana on 27 October 1941, the move didn't actually transpire until 4 November, the attachment to the 9th Bomb Group (H) continuing. Unfortunately, conditions at Atkinson were not adequate to support the B-17B, and it was left behind in Panama, being transferred to the 7th Reconnaissance Squadron prior to the unit's departure.

From British Guiana, the squadron operated as an element of the infant Trinidad Base Command at Atkinson Field.   In late 1941, with the coming of war, the unit immediately commenced far-ranging patrols with its remaining three B-18's and, now, two B-18A's. The attachment to the 9th Bomb Group became a formal assignment on 25 February 1942, and, by mid-February, following an accident to one of its B-18s and severe maintenance problems with the other aircraft (one other B-18 and two B-18As), the Squadron could count only one B-18A as airworthy and ready for action.

The unit commander also reported that he had "no fully combat trained crews," and, considering that this was the only Air Corps unit at Atkinson at the time, things had deteriorated dangerously.  Apparently there was a recognition of this dire situation within the squadron for, on 22 April 1942, the unit was reorganized entirely as the 430th Bombardment Squadron.

Training unit
In October 1942, the 430th returned to the United States, where it was assigned to the Army Air Forces School of Applied Tactics (AAFSAT) at Orlando Army Air Base, Florida.  However, the squadron was not manned until March 1943.  The squadron was equipped with Boeing B-17 Flying Fortresses, Consolidated B-24 Liberators, North American B-25 Mitchells, and Martin B-26 Marauders (and a Boeing 247, which had been impressed as the C-73) to train cadres of newly formed bombardment units.  It also performed operational testing of new equipment.

However, the Army Air Forces (AAF) was finding that standard military units like the 430th, whose manning was based on relatively inflexible tables of organization were proving not well adapted to the training mission.  Accordingly, the AAF adopted a more functional system in which each base was organized into a separate numbered unit.    The 9th Group and its components moved on paper to Dalhart Army Air Field, Texas on 28 March 1944, and its mission with AAFSAT was assumed by the 906th AAF Base Unit (Bombardment, Heavy) and the 907th AAF Base Unit (Bombardment, Medium and Light).

B-29 operations and combat

The squadron began to reform as a Boeing B-29 Superfortress unit at Dalhart.  However, before the squadron could become fully manned and equipped, the AAF reorganized its B-29 units.  Although this reorganization increased the number of aircraft assigned to each squadron and to the group, it reduced the number of squadrons in the group from four to three.  The squadron was inactivated in this reorganization on 10 May, and its crews and airplanes were distributed to the other three squadrons of the 9th Group.

A few weeks later, on 1 June 1944, the squadron was activated once again at Davis-Monthan Field as a component of the newly organized 502d Bombardment Group.  Five days later, the squadron moved to Dalhart Army Air Field, Texas to begin training with the B-29.  The squadron trained at Dalhart and at Grand Island Army Air Field, Nebraska until 7 April 1945, when it departed for the Pacific.

The squadron arrived at its combat station, Northwest Field, Guam on 12 May 1945.  It flew its first combat mission on 30 June, an attack on Rota.  It carried out attacks on Truk during July.  It flew its first mission against the Japanese Home Islands on 15 July, against the oil refinery at Kudamatsu, and until the end of the war, concentrated on attacks on the Japanese petroleum industry.  It was awarded a Distinguished Unit Citation for August 1945 attacks on the coal liquefaction plant at Ube, a tank farm at Amagasaki  and the Nippon Oil refinery at Tsuchizaki.  After the war it participated in show of force missions and evacuated prisoners of war.  The squadron remained on Guam until it was inactivated on 15 April 1946.

Unmanned vehicle operations
The squadron returned to its designation of 44th Reconnaissance Squadron when it was activated at Creech Air Force Base, Nevada on 1 April 2015 to fly unmanned aerial vehicles in the reconnaissance role. It has been reported that the unit operates Lockheed Martin RQ-170 Sentinels.

Lineage
 44th Aero Squadron
 Organized as the 44th Aero Squadron on 30 June 1917
 Redesignated Squadron K, Wilbur Wright Field, Ohio in October 1918
 Redesignated Squadron P, Wilbur Wright Field, Ohio in November 1918
 Demobilized on 30 April 1919
 Reconstituted and consolidated with the 44th Observation Squadron as the 44th Observation Squadron on 8 April 1924

 44th Reconnaissance Squadron
 Authorized as the 44th Squadron (Observation) on 10 June 1922
 Organized on 26 June 1922
 Redesignated 44th Observation Squadron on 25 January 1923
 Consolidated with Squadron P, Wilbur Wright Field, Ohio on 8 April 1924
 Inactivated on 31 July 1927
 Activated on 1 April 1931
 Redesignated 44th Reconnaissance Squadron on 1 September 1937
 Redesignated 44th Reconnaissance Squadron (Medium Range) on 6 December 1939
 Redesignated 44th Reconnaissance Squadron (Heavy) on 20 November 1940
 Redesignated 430th Bombardment Squadron (Heavy) on 22 April 1942
 Redesignated 430th Bombardment Squadron, Very Heavy on 28 March 1944
 Inactivated on 10 May 1944
 Activated on 1 June 1944
 Inactivated on 15 April 1946
 Redesignated 44th Reconnaissance Squadron on 19 February 2015
 Activated on 1 April 2015.

Assignments
 Unknown, 1917–1919
 Eighth Corps Area, 26 June 1922 (attached to Field Artillery School, c. August 1922)
 Air Corps Training Center, c. 25 June – 31 July 1927
 6th Composite Group, 1 April 1931 (attached to 16th Pursuit Group, c. December 1932)
 16th Pursuit Group, 1 September 1937
 Probably assigned to 19th Wing (later 19th Bombardment Wing), 1 February 1940 (attached to 16th Pursuit Group)
 Probably assigned to Panama Canal Air Force, 20 November 1940 (attached to 9th Bombardment Group)
 9th Bombardment Group, 25 February 1942 – 10 May 1944
 502d Bombardment Group, 1 June 1944 – 15 April 1946
 732nd Operations Group, 1 April 2015 – unknown
 432nd Operations Group, unknown – present

Stations

 Camp Kelly (later Kelly Field), Texas, 30 June 1917
 Wilbur Wright Field, Ohio, 25 August 1917 – 30 April 1919
 Post Field, Oklahoma, 26 June 1922
 March Field, California, 25 June – 31 July 1927
 France Field, Panama Canal Zone, 1 April 1931
 Albrook Field, Panama Canal Zone, 13 May 1932
 Howard Field, Panama Canal Zone, 8 July – 27 October 1941
 Atkinson Field, British Guiana, 4 November 1941

 Orlando Army Air Base, Florida, 31 October 1942
 Brooksville Army Air Field, Florida, 6 January 1944
 Orlando Army Air Base, Florida, 25 February 1944
 Dalhart Army Air Field, Texas, 6 March – 10 May 1944
 Davis-Monthan Field, Arizona, 1 June 1944
 Dalhart Army Air Field, Texas, 5 June 1944
 Grand Island Army Air Field, Nebraska, 26 September 1944 – 7 April 1945
 Northwest Field, Guam, 12 May 1945 – 15 April 1946
 Creech Air Force Base, Nevada, 1 April 2015 – present

Aircraft

 Standard SJ-1, 1917–1919
 Curtiss JN-4, 1917–1919
 Possibly Dayton-Wright DH-4, 1917–1919
 Dayton-Wright DH-4, 1922–1927
 Evidently Douglas O-2, 1922–1927
 Douglas OA-4 Dolphin, 1931–1939
 Thomas-Morse O-19, 1932–1937
 Martin B-10, 1936–1939
 Douglas B-18 Bolo, 1938–1942
 Boeing B-17 Flying Fortress, 1943–1944
 Consolidated B-24 Liberator, 1943–1944
 North American B-25 Mitchell, 1943–1944
 Martin B-26 Marauder, 1943–1944
 Boeing C-73, 1943–1944
 Boeing B-29 Superfortress, 1944–1946
 Lockheed Martin RQ-170 Sentinel, 2015–present

Awards and campaigns

See also

 List of American Aero Squadrons

References

Notes
 Explanatory notes

 Citations

Bibliography

 
 
 
 
 Maurer, Maurer (1983). Air Force Combat Units of World War II. Maxwell AFB, Alabama: Office of Air Force History. .

External links

Bombardment squadrons of the United States Army Air Forces
Military units and formations in British Guiana in World War II